Michelle Gray is a state legislator in Arkansas. She serves in the Arkansas House of Representatives. She is a Republican. She represents the 62nd District. She is a graduate of Arkansas State University. She is married to Adam Gray and has five children. She is Baptist. She first served in the House in 2015. She lives in Melbourne, Arkansas.

References

Year of birth missing (living people)
Living people
Republican Party members of the Arkansas House of Representatives
Baptists from Arkansas
Arkansas State University alumni
Women state legislators in Arkansas
20th-century American politicians
21st-century American women politicians
20th-century American women politicians
21st-century American politicians